Socialist Revolutionary Party was a major political party in Imperial Russia from 1902 to its functional dissolution in 1921 and official disbandment in 1940

Socialist Revolutionary Party may also refer to:
 Socialist Revolutionary Party (France)
 Socialist Revolutionary Party (Persia)

See also 
 Revolutionary Socialist Party (disambiguation)